Catalina Rosales Montiel is a paralympic athlete from Mexico competing mainly in category F58 throwing events.

Catalina's Paralympic games career has spanned four games and 16 years.  Her first games came in 1992 Summer Paralympics in Barcelona where she competed in the discus, shot and javelin.  She was to repeat these events again in 1996 Summer Paralympics this time winning silver in shot put and bronze in discus. These would prove to be her only Paralympic medals as despite competing in all three throws in 2004 and the discus and shot in 2008, she failed to add to her medal tally.

Notes

References

External links
 

Paralympic athletes of Mexico
Athletes (track and field) at the 1992 Summer Paralympics
Athletes (track and field) at the 1996 Summer Paralympics
Athletes (track and field) at the 2004 Summer Paralympics
Athletes (track and field) at the 2008 Summer Paralympics
Paralympic silver medalists for Mexico
Paralympic bronze medalists for Mexico
Living people
Medalists at the 1996 Summer Paralympics
Year of birth missing (living people)
Paralympic medalists in athletics (track and field)
Mexican female shot putters
Mexican female discus throwers
Medalists at the 2007 Parapan American Games
Medalists at the 2011 Parapan American Games
Wheelchair shot putters
Wheelchair discus throwers
Paralympic shot putters
Paralympic discus throwers